Hotel Kalifornia is the eighth studio album by American rap rock band Hollywood Undead. It was released on August 12, 2022 through Dove & Grenade Media and BMG. The album was produced by No Love for the Middle Child.

Background and promotion
On September 5, 2021, the band announced that they were working on new music for their upcoming eighth studio album. On February 25, 2022, a few months after the announcement, the band released the first single "Chaos". On April 20, the band unveiled second single "Wild in These Streets" and its corresponding music video.

On June 8, the band released the third single "City of the Dead". At the same time, they officially announced the album itself while also revealed the album cover, the track list and release date. On July 8, one month before the album release, the band unveiled the fourth single "Trap God". On March 1, 2023, the band released the fifth single "Evil" while also announcing the deluxe edition of the album which is set for release on April 28.

Critical reception

The album received mostly positive reviews from critics. Writing for Louder Sound, Nik Young calls the album "...an honest, confident and catchy release that winds up oddly hard to resist." New Noise gave the album 4 out of 5 and stated: "All in all, Hotel Kalifornia is an outstanding piece of work that is sure to keep fans entertained the whole way through." Wall of Sound gave the album a score 7/10 and saying: "While Hotel Kalifornia probably isn't going to win over any new fans, it is a consistently fresh addition of their bouncy nu-metal style that'll have you up on your feet as you crank up the volume to the limit. If you've enjoyed their previous albums, there's a pretty good chance of you giving this a go on your weekend drives outta town."

Track listing

Notes
 Track 1 is stylized in all caps.

Personnel
Hollywood Undead
 Jorel "J-Dog" Decker – vocals, guitars, bass, keyboards, programming, composition
 Dylan "Funny Man" Alvarez – vocals, composition
 George "Johnny 3 Tears" Ragan – vocals, bass, composition
 Jordon "Charlie Scene" Terrell – vocals, guitars, composition
 Daniel "Danny" Murillo – vocals, keyboards, programming, guitars, bass, composition

Additional musicians
 Greg Garman – drums

Additional personnel
 No Love for the Middle Child – production
 Drew Fulk – production, composition on track 1
 Erik Ron – production, composition on track 7
 Andrew Migliore – production, composition on track 7
 Zakk Cervini and Chris Athens – engineering
 Michael Futterer – composition

Charts

References

2022 albums
Hollywood Undead albums